Daniel Castellanos Arteaga was a Uruguayan politician Foreign Minister, diplomat and writer.

Life 
 In 1909 he was a member of the Uruguayan Committee on Primary Education
 From 1911 to 1915 he was secretary in the council for the protection of the offenders and adolescents
 From 1915 to 1927 he was Attorney of the waterworks of Montevideo
 From 1916 to 1928 he was professor of history at the University of Montevideo
 From 1927 to 1930 he was secretary of Juan Campisteguy
 From 1930 to 1939 he was Minister plenipotentiary in Madrid with accreditation in Lisbon.
 From 1939 to 1942 he was Minister plenipotentiary in London
 In 1942 he was assigned to the Senate of Uruguay.
 From October 4, 1945 to March 1, 1947, he was Minister of Public Education and Social Security in a government cabinet of Juan José de Amézaga.
 Within the Colorado Party (Uruguay) he was assigned to the Blancoacevedista wing, which was named after Eduardo Blanco Acevedo.
 From 1948 to 1952 he was twice Minister of Foreign Affairs in the Cabinet of Luis Batlle Berres.
His remnants were auctioned.

References

Foreign ministers of Uruguay
Ambassadors of Uruguay to the United Kingdom
Ambassadors of Uruguay to Spain
1882 births
1968 deaths
Colorado Party (Uruguay) politicians